Papravənd is a village in the Agdam District of Azerbaijan.

History 
The village was located in the Armenian-occupied territories surrounding Nagorno-Karabakh, coming under the control of ethnic Armenian forces during the First Nagorno-Karabakh War in the early 1990s. The village subsequently became part of the breakaway Republic of Artsakh as part of its Martakert Province, where it was known as Nor Karmiravan. It was returned to Azerbaijan as part of the 2020 Nagorno-Karabakh ceasefire agreement.

Historical heritage sites 
Historical heritage sites in and around the village include tombs from the 2nd–1st millennia BCE.

Localities 
Papravand Mausoleum

Notable people 
 Faig Aghayev — National Hero of Azerbaijan.
 Ramiz Abbasli — Azerbaijani author, translator of fiction.

References

External links 
 

Populated places in Aghdam District